The 2020 Bob Willis Trophy  was a first-class cricket tournament held in the 2020 English cricket season, and the inaugural edition of the Bob Willis Trophy. It was separate from the County Championship, which was not held in 2020 due to the impact of the COVID-19 pandemic in the United Kingdom. The eighteen county cricket teams were split into three regional groups of six, with the two group winners with the most points advancing to a final held at Lord's. The maximum number of overs bowled in a day was reduced from 96 to 90, and the team's first innings could be no longer than 120 overs.

After a delay due to the pandemic, counties passed a majority vote to start the season on 1 August 2020, with the final starting on 23 September 2020.

In the final round of matches, the game between Gloucestershire and Northamptonshire was abandoned at lunch on the first day, after a member of the Northamptonshire squad provided a positive test for COVID-19. The match was recorded as a draw, with Northamptonshire taking ten points, and Gloucestershire eight. Neither side were in contention to reach the final of the tournament.

Essex became the first team to qualify for the final of the tournament, after they beat Middlesex by nine wickets in their final match, and Derbyshire failed to gain a batting point in their match against Lancashire. Somerset became the second team to qualify for the final after they beat Worcestershire by 60 runs in their fifth match of the tournament. The final finished as a draw, with Essex winning the tournament, after securing a lead in the first innings of the match.

In October 2020, Sussex were deducted 24 points after bowler Mitchell Claydon was found guilty of a ball tampering offence. Claydon was adjudged to have applied hand sanitiser to the ball during a game against Middlesex in August. The player also received a nine-game ban.

While it was promoted as being a one-off competition, the new structure of three groups of six was retained for the 2021 County Championship.

Background

The first round of matches in the County Championship were originally scheduled to start on 12 April, with the final round of matches finishing on 25 September. However in March 2020, due to the COVID-19 pandemic, the England and Wales Cricket Board (ECB) announced that the season would be delayed until at least 28 May 2020. The following month, Abu Dhabi Cricket (ADC) suggested using facilities in the United Arab Emirates between October and January as a possible solution to playing some fixtures. On 24 April 2020, the ECB confirmed that no professional cricket would be played in England before 1 July 2020. As a result of the pandemic, the vast majority of clubs placed players and staff on furlough.

In late May 2020, the ECB looked at the idea of starting the County Championship in August, split into three groups of six teams, with a final at Lord's. The ECB also confirmed that no domestic cricket would be played before 1 August 2020. In June 2020, some clubs raised concerns about the logistics of travelling and the financial viability of playing first-class cricket, with 50-over matches being a more realistic possibility. On 29 June 2020, the ECB confirmed that the domestic cricket season would begin on 1 August 2020, with the format to be agreed in early July. On 7 July 2020, the majority of counties voted to start the season on 1 August 2020.

On 26 July 2020, a crowd of 1,000 spectators were allowed to watch a test event at The Oval in London, the first time people had been to see a live cricket match since the start of the pandemic. Following the success of the trial, a pilot scheme would have allowed up to 2,500 fans to attend the first two days of play of Surrey and Warwickshire's first matches. However, on 31 July 2020 Prime Minister Boris Johnson announced crowds would not be allowed to attend sporting events following an increase in COVID-19 infection rates.

Teams
The teams were placed into the following groups:

 North Group: Derbyshire, Durham, Lancashire, Leicestershire, Nottinghamshire, Yorkshire
 Central Group: Glamorgan, Gloucestershire, Northamptonshire, Somerset, Warwickshire, Worcestershire
 South Group: Essex, Hampshire, Kent, Middlesex, Surrey, Sussex

Fixtures
The fixtures for the tournament were announced on 24 July 2020. Following local COVID-19 lockdown restrictions in Leicester, Leicestershire County Cricket Club's first home fixture was moved to a neutral venue.

North Group

Central Group

South Group

Standings
Teams receive 16 points for a win and 8 for a draw or tie. Bonus points (a maximum of 5 batting points and 3 bowling points) may be scored during the first 110 overs of each team's first innings.

North Group

Central Group

South Group

Final

References

External links
 Series home at ESPN Cricinfo

2020
Bob Willis Trophy
Bob Willis Trophy